Amazonas State may refer to:
 Amazonas State (Brazil)
 Amazonas State (Venezuela)

See also 
 Amazonas (disambiguation)

State name disambiguation pages